Benny Golson (born January 25, 1929) is an American bebop/hard bop jazz tenor saxophonist, composer, and arranger. He came to prominence with the big bands of Lionel Hampton and Dizzy Gillespie, more as a writer than a performer, before launching his solo career. Golson is known for co-founding and co-leading The Jazztet with trumpeter Art Farmer in 1959. From the late 1960s through the 1970s Golson was in demand as an arranger for film and television and thus was less active as a performer, but he and Farmer re-formed the Jazztet in 1982.

Many of Golson's compositions have become jazz standards including "I Remember Clifford", "Blues March", "Stablemates", "Whisper Not", and "Killer Joe". He is regarded as "one of the most significant contributors" to the development of hard bop jazz, and was a recipient of a Grammy Trustees Award in 2021.

Early life and education
Golson began learning the piano at age nine, then switched to the saxophone when he was 14. While a student at Benjamin Franklin High School in Philadelphia, he played with several other promising young musicians, including John Coltrane, Red Garland, Jimmy Heath, Percy Heath, Philly Joe Jones, and Red Rodney. He later attended Howard University.

Career 
After graduating from Howard University, Golson joined Bull Moose Jackson's rhythm and blues band; Tadd Dameron, whom Golson came to consider the most important influence on his writing, was Jackson's pianist at the time.

From 1953 to 1959, Golson played with Dameron's band and then with the bands of Lionel Hampton, Johnny Hodges, Earl Bostic, Dizzy Gillespie, and Art Blakey and the Jazz Messengers, with whom he recorded the classic Moanin''' in 1958.

Golson was working with the Lionel Hampton band at the Apollo Theater in Harlem in 1956 when he learned that Clifford Brown, a noted and well-liked jazz trumpeter who had done a stint with him in Dameron's band, had died in a car accident. Golson was so moved by the event that he composed the threnody "I Remember Clifford", as a tribute to a fellow musician and friend.

In addition to "I Remember Clifford", many of Golson's other compositions have become jazz standards. Songs such as "Stablemates", "Killer Joe", "Whisper Not", "Along Came Betty", and "Are You Real?", have been performed and recorded numerous times by many musicians.

From 1959 to 1962, Golson co-led the Jazztet with Art Farmer, mainly playing his own compositions. Golson then left jazz to concentrate on studio and orchestral work for 12 years. During this time he composed music for such television shows as Mannix, Ironside, Room 222, M*A*S*H, The Partridge Family and Mission: Impossible. He also formulated and conducted arrangements to various recordings, such as Eric Is Here, a 1967 album by Eric Burdon, which features five of Golson's arrangements, conducted by Golson.

During the mid-1970s, Golson returned to jazz playing and recording. Critic Scott Yanow of AllMusic wrote that Golson's sax style underwent a major shift with his performing comeback, more resembling avant-garde Archie Shepp than the swing-era Don Byas influence of Golson's youth. In 1982, Golson re-organized the Jazztet.

Golson played a cameo role in the 2004 movie The Terminal, related to his appearance in "A Great Day in Harlem", a group photograph of prominent jazz musicians taken in 1958. Main character Viktor Navorski (Tom Hanks) travels to the US from Europe to obtain Golson's signature; Golson was one of seven musicians then surviving from the photo, the others being Johnny Griffin (died 2008), Eddie Locke (died 2009), Hank Jones (died 2010), Marian McPartland (died 2013), Horace Silver (died 2014), and Sonny Rollins. Golson's song "Something in B Flat" (from the album Benny Golson's New York Scene) can be heard during a scene where Viktor is painting and redecorating part of an airport terminal; in a later scene, Golson's band performs "Killer Joe". The album Terminal 1 was released by Golson shortly after the film, as a "homage to Steven Spielberg", its director.

 Awards and honors 
In 1996, Golson received the NEA Jazz Masters Award of the National Endowment for the Arts.

In 1999, Golson was awarded an honorary doctorate of music from Berklee College of Music.

In October 2007, Golson received the Mellon Living Legend Legacy Award, presented by the Mid Atlantic Arts Foundation at a ceremony at the Kennedy Center. Additionally, during the same month, he won the University of Pittsburgh International Academy of Jazz Outstanding Lifetime Achievement Award at the university's 37th Annual Jazz Concert in the Carnegie Music Hall.

In November 2009, Golson was inducted into the International Academy of Jazz Hall of Fame, during a performance at the University of Pittsburgh's annual jazz seminar and concert.

The Howard University Jazz Studies program created a prestigious award in his honor called the "Benny Golson Jazz Master Award" in 1996. Many distinguished jazz artists have received this award.

 Notable compositions 
"And You Called My Name", 1954
"Stablemates", 1955
"Whisper Not", 1956
"Are You Real?", 1958
"I Remember Clifford", 1957
"Just by Myself", 1957
"Blues March", 1958  
"Park Avenue Petite", aka "From Dream to Dream", 1959
"Along Came Betty", 1958
"Killer Joe", 1960
"Beauty And The Blues"
"Blues After Dark"
"Five Spot After Dark"
"Gipsy Jingle-Jangle"
"Minor Vamp"
"Step Lightly"
"Strut Time"
"The Stroller"

Gallery
Benny Golson in Denmark (2007)

 Discography 

 The Modern Touch (Riverside 1958) – recorded in 1957
 The Other Side of Benny Golson (Riverside, 1958)
 Benny Golson and the Philadelphians (United Artists, 1958)
 Benny Golson's New York Scene (Contemporary, 1959) – recorded in 1957
 Gone with Golson (New Jazz, 1959)
 Groovin' with Golson (New Jazz, 1959)
 Winchester Special with Lem Winchester (New Jazz, 1959)
 Gettin' with It (New Jazz, 1960) – recorded in 1959
 Take a Number from 1 to 10 (Argo, 1961) – recorded in 1960-61
 Pop + Jazz = Swing (Audio Fidelity, 1962)
 Turning Point (Mercury, 1962)
 Free (Argo, 1963) – recorded in 1962
 The Roland Kirk Quartet Meets the Benny Golson Orchestra with Roland Kirk (Mercury, 1964)
 Stockholm Sojourn (Prestige, 1965) – recorded in 1964
 Tune In, Turn On (Verve, 1967)
 Killer Joe (Columbia, 1977)
 California Message with Curtis Fuller (Baystate, 1981)
 One More Mem'ry with Curtis Fuller (Baystate, 1982)
 Time Speaks with Freddie Hubbard and Woody Shaw (Baystate, 1983)
 This Is for You, John (Baystate, 1984) – recorded in 1983
 Stardust with Freddie Hubbard (Denon, 1987)
 Benny Golson Quartet Live (Dreyfus, 1991) – recorded in 1989
 Benny Golson Quartet (LRC Ltd. 1990)
 Domingo (Dreyfus, 1992) – recorded in 1991
 I Remember Miles (Alfa Jazz, 1993) – recorded in 1992
 That's Funky (Meldac Jazz, 1995) – recorded in 1994
 Up Jumped Benny (Arkadia Jazz, 1997) – recorded in 1996
 Tenor Legacy (Arkadia Jazz, 1998) – recorded in 1996
 Remembering Clifford (Milestone, 1998) – recorded in 1997
 One Day, Forever (Arkadia Jazz, 2001) – recorded in 1996-2000
 Terminal 1 (Concord, 2004)
 New Time, New 'Tet (Concord, 2009) – recorded in 2008
 Horizon Ahead'' (HighNote, 2016) – recorded in 2015

See also
 List of jazz arrangers

References

External links 
Official Site
Listening In: An Interview with Benny Golson by Bob Rosenbaum, Los Angeles, February 1982 (PDF file)

Benny Golson Recreates His Great 'Jazztet' NPR Interview 2009 Jan 24

1929 births
African-American jazz musicians
American jazz composers
American male jazz composers
American jazz tenor saxophonists
American male saxophonists
Bebop saxophonists
Hard bop saxophonists
Howard University alumni
The Jazz Messengers members
Living people
Musicians from Philadelphia
Prestige Records artists
Riverside Records artists
21st-century saxophonists
Jazz musicians from Pennsylvania
The Jazztet members
Orchestra U.S.A. members
HighNote Records artists
Argo Records artists